The 1993 Centennial Cup is the 23rd Junior "A" 1993 ice hockey National Championship for the Canadian Junior A Hockey League.

The Centennial Cup was competed for by the winners of the Doyle Cup, Anavet Cup, Central Canadian Championship, the Eastern Canadian Champion and a host city.

The tournament was hosted by the Amherst Ramblers and Amherst, Nova Scotia.

The Playoffs

Round Robin

Results
Amherst Ramblers defeated Chateauguay Elites 2-1
Kelowna Spartans defeated Chateauguay Elites 8-3
Antigonish Bulldogs defeated Flin Flon Bombers 4-2
Kelowna Spartans defeated Antigonish Bulldogs 10-4
Amherst Ramblers defeated Flin Flon Bombers 6-0
Kelowna Spartans defeated Amherst Ramblers 5-2
Chateauguay Elites defeated Flin Flon Bombers 5-1
Amherst Ramblers defeated Antigonish Bulldogs 5-4
Kelowna Spartans defeated Flin Flon 4-3 for the Abbott Cup
Chateauguay Elites defeated Antigonish Bulldogs 4-3 in Double Overtime

Semi-finals and Final

Please Note: The semi-final, Amherst vs. Chateauguay, was won in Overtime

Awards
Most Valuable Player: Steffon Walby (Kelowna Spartans)
Top Scorer: Martin Masa (Kelowna Spartans)
Most Sportsmanlike Player: Martin Duval (Chateauguay Elites)

All-Star Team
Forward
Curtis Fry (Kelowna Spartans)
Martin Masa (Kelowna Spartans)
Steffon Walby (Kelowna Spartans)
Defence
John Copley (Antigonish Bulldogs)
Neil Sorochan (Amherst Ramblers)
Goal
Todd Hunter (Amherst Ramblers)

Roll of League Champions
AJHL: Olds Grizzlys
BCHL: Kelowna Spartans
CJHL: Ottawa Senators
MJHL: Dauphin Kings
MJAHL: Antigonish Bulldogs
NOJHL: Powassan Hawks
PCJHL: Williams Lake Mustangs
QPJHL: Chateauguay Elites
SJHL: Flin Flon Bombers

See also
Canadian Junior A Hockey League
Royal Bank Cup
Anavet Cup
Doyle Cup
Dudley Hewitt Cup
Fred Page Cup
Abbott Cup
Mowat Cup

External links
Royal Bank Cup Website

1993
Cup
Amherst, Nova Scotia